ICHEC may refer to:

 ICHEC Brussels Management School
 Irish Centre for High-End Computing